This is a list of Skatoony episodes.

List of episodes

Season 1

Season 2

Season 3

References 

Lists of British animated television series episodes
Lists of Canadian children's animated television series episodes